The women's 800 metres event at the 1969 European Indoor Games was held on 9 March in Belgrade.

 ==Results==

References

800 metres at the European Athletics Indoor Championships
800